Basketball was one of the many sports which was held at the 1954 Asian Games in Manila, Philippines. It acted as the Asian qualifying tournament for the 1954 FIBA World Championship in Brazil.

Medalists

Results

Preliminary round

Group A

Group B

Final round

Final standing

References
Results

 
Basketball
1954
1954 in Asian basketball
1954 in Philippine basketball
International basketball competitions hosted by the Philippines